Kaleo may refer to:
Kaleo, Ghana, a small town in the Nadowli district of the Upper West Region of Ghana

Persons
 Given name
Kaleo Kanahele (born 1996), American Paralympic volleyballist
Kaleo La Belle, film director
Kaleo Wassman (born 1977), American musician

Middle name
Kurt Scott Kaleo Moylan (born 1939), Guamanian politician, first elected Lieutenant Governor of Guam

Family name
John Kaleo (born 1971), American football quarterback

Music
Kaleo (band), an Icelandic band

Fictional characters
Detective Kaleo, a character that appeared in season 1 of Hawaii Five-0
Kaleo, one of the eldest vampires in Shattered Mirror